This is a list of television programmes broadcast by MTV India.

Currently broadcast

 Brave Combat Federation (2018–)
 La Liga (2021–)
MTV Ex Or Next (2022–)
MTV Hustle (2019–)
 MTV Nishedh (2020–)
 MTV Roadies (2003–)
MTV Splitsvilla (2008–)

Formerly broadcast

Anthology series

MTV Big F (2015–2017)
MTV Fully Faltoo Films (2008)
 MTV Love On The Run (2017–2018)
 MTV Luv Reel (2010)
 MTV Webbed (2013–2014)
 Road To Love (2012)

Comedy series

 CY vs CY (2004–2005)
 Kaisi Yeh Yaariyan (2014–2015)
 MTV Bajao d (2004–2005)
 MTV Bakra (1999–2005)
 MTV Heavy Metal (2004–2005)
 MTV Kahani Mein Twist (2013–2014)
 Pyaar Vyaar and All That (2005–2006)
 MTV Reality Stars (2013)
Zubaan Pe Lagaam (2008)

Drama series

 Bring on the Night (2012)
 Haunted Weekends with Sunny Leone (2014)
 Kitni Mast Hai Zindagi (2004–2005)
 MTV Fanaah (2014–2015)
 MTV Girls On Top (2016)
 Traffic: An MTV EXIT Special (2014)
 Warrior High (2015)

Sports/MMA

Box Cricket League (2018–2019)
EFL Cup (2018)
 International Premier Kabaddi League (2019)
 Super Fight League (2014–2017)

Reality/competitive  programming

 The Anti Social Network (2019)
 Bacardi Music CDs Legacy Competition (2015)
 Captain Shack (2012)
 Coke Studio @ MTV (2011–2015)
 The Dewarists(2011–2013) 
 Drive with MTV (2014)
 Elovator Pitch (2019)
 Fame Gurukul @ MTV (2005)
 India's Next Top Model (2015–2018)
 The Junkyard Project (2016)
 Match India Poker League (2017–2019)
 Miss Teen India (2008)
 MTV Ace of Space (2018–2019)
 MTV Ace of Quarantine (2020)
 MTV Angels of Rock (2016)
 MTV Anything For Love (2021–2022)
 MTV Aquanoon party (2013)
 MTV Bigg Boss- Extra Dose (2017–2018)
 MTV Chase the Monsoon (2013–2017)
 MTV Campus Diaries (2013–2016)
 MTV Connected (2009)
 MTV Date to Remember (2018)
 MTV Dating in the Dark (2018)
 MTV Dropout Pvt Ltd. (2017)
 MTV Fabulous Lives (2008–2009)
 MTV Fame Istaan (2017)
 MTV Fanta Fantastic Five (2008–2009)
 MTV Force India The Fast and The Gorgeous (2009)
 MTV GTalk (2008–2009)
 MTV GateCrash (2012)
 MTV Girls Night Out (2010)
 MTV Stuntmania (2009–2010)
 MTV Gyaando (2014)
 MTV Jhand Hogi Sab Ki (2014)
 MTV Junk Yard Project (2016)
 MTV Loveline (1999)
 MTV Love School (2015–2019)
 MTV Making The Cut (2010)
 MTV Pantaloons Style Super Stars (2019–2020)
 MTV Rann VJ Run (2013)
 MTV Rock On (2009–2010)
 MTV Sound Trippin (2012)
MTV Supermodel of the Year (2019–2021)
 MTV Trackstar (2016)
 MTV Troll Police (2018)
 MTV True Life (2011)
 MTV Unplugged (2011–2019)
 MTV VJ Hunt (2002)
  MTV’s Video Ga Ga in 2003. (2003)
  Nokia Music Theatre (2012)
 Quikr Chronicles (2014)
 Time Out With Imam (2013)
 U Cypher (2018)
 Ultimate Fitness Fan (2014)
 VJ Chronicles (2015)

Variety shows

 Club MTV (1997)
 MTV 123 (1998–1999)
MTV Chill out (1998–1999)
 MTV Grind (1996–1998)
 MTV Gone in 60 Seconds (2009)
 MTV Land(1996–1998)
 MTV Made in India(1996–1998)
 MTV Most Wanted (1998–1999)
 MTV Mute (2009)
 MTV Recycled(1997–1998)
 MTV School of Grooming (2017)
 MTV Samachar (2009)
 MTV Stripped (2009)
 MTV Style Check (2002)
 MTV U(1997–1998)
 MTV Wassup – Voice of Youngistaan (2008–2010)
 MTV What the Hack! (2009–2010)
MTV'S Hipshakers (1999)
 Silly Point (2012)

References

 
MTV
MTV
India